VK Spartak Subotica is a water polo club from Subotica, Serbia. It was established in 1946, as part of the larger Spartak Subotica sports society. They were champions of Serbia in 1952, 1956 and 1958 (when Serbian league was lower-level than the federal Yugoslavian one). In recent years, they mostly complete in Serbian first league division "B".

External links
 Official website

Water polo clubs in Serbia
Sport in Subotica